is a Japanese cyclist.

Watanabe has competed in the keirin and other track events at the 2008 Summer Olympics and 2012 Summer Olympics in London. He also competes in Japanese professional keirin cycling competitions.

References

1983 births
Living people
Japanese male cyclists
Cyclists at the 2008 Summer Olympics
Cyclists at the 2012 Summer Olympics
Cyclists at the 2016 Summer Olympics
Olympic cyclists of Japan
Sportspeople from Fukushima Prefecture
Japanese track cyclists
Asian Games medalists in cycling
Cyclists at the 2006 Asian Games
Cyclists at the 2010 Asian Games
Cyclists at the 2014 Asian Games
Asian Games gold medalists for Japan
Asian Games silver medalists for Japan
Asian Games bronze medalists for Japan
Medalists at the 2006 Asian Games
Medalists at the 2010 Asian Games
Medalists at the 2014 Asian Games